Tsukamurella strandjordii is a Gram-positive and aerobic bacterium from the genus of Tsukamurella which has been isolated from the blood of a young girl with acute mycelogenous leukemia.

References

External links 
Type strain of Tsukamurella strandjordii at BacDive -  the Bacterial Diversity Metadatabase

Mycobacteriales
Bacteria described in 2002